Freziera longipes is a species of plant in the Pentaphylacaceae family. It is endemic to Colombia.

References

longipes
Endemic flora of Colombia
Near threatened plants
Taxonomy articles created by Polbot
Taxa named by Edmond Tulasne